The 1959–60 Lancashire Cup was the forty-seventh occasion on which the competition had been held. Warrington won the trophy by beating St. Helens by the score of 5-4.

Background 

With again no invitation to a junior club this season, the total number of teams entering the competition remained the same at 14.
The same fixture format was retained, and due to the number of clubs this resulted in no bye but one “blank” or “dummy” fixture in the first round, and one bye in the second round

Competition and results

Round 1 
Involved  7 matches (with no bye but one “blank” fixture) and 14 clubs

Round 1 - Replay  
Involved  1 match

Round 2 - quarterfinals 
Involved 3 matches (with one bye) and 7 clubs

Round 3 – semifinals  
Involved 2 matches and 4 clubs

Final 
The match was played at Central Park, Wigan, (historically in the county of Lancashire). The attendance was 39,237 and receipts were £6,424. This is the last time the attendance at a Lancashire Cup final would approach 40,000.

Teams and scorers  

Scoring - Try = three (3) points - Goal = two (2) points - Drop goal = two (2) points

The road to success

Notes and comments 
1 * The first Lancashie Cup match to be played since the stadium was renamed after the former chairman James Hilton 
2 * The fixture date was given in the official St. Helens archives as Wednesday 30 September - but RUGBY LEAGUE review gives the date as Tuesday 29 September 
3 * Central Park was the home ground of Wigan with a final capacity of 18,000, although the record attendance was  47,747 for Wigan v St Helens 27 March 1959

See also 
1959–60 Northern Rugby Football League season
Rugby league county cups

References

External links
Saints Heritage Society
1896–97 Northern Rugby Football Union season at wigan.rlfans.com
Hull&Proud Fixtures & Results 1896/1897
Widnes Vikings - One team, one passion Season In Review - 1896-97
The Northern Union at warringtonwolves.org

RFL Lancashire Cup
Lancashire Cup